Ross Davis (born June 3, 1950) is a former American racing driver from Grand Junction, Colorado who competed in the CART Championship Car series in 1980 and 1981.  He made five starts as an owner-driver with a best finish of 13th place at Watkins Glen International in 1981 and finished 36th in the 1981 championship.  He attempted but failed to qualify for 3 additional races in the 1981 season. He is reported to currently live in Boise, Idaho.

References

1950 births
Champ Car drivers
Living people
People from Grand Junction, Colorado
Racing drivers from Colorado